Aviation Act of 1917 was a United States military appropriations bill authorizing a temporary increase for the United States Army Signal Corps. The Act of Congress authorized provisions for airship or dirigible operations governed by the U.S. Army Signal Corps Aeronautical Division. The legislation provided United States President Woodrow Wilson emergency authority for the maintenance, manufacture, operation, purchase, and repair of airships and associated aerial machines.

Sections of the Act
In an attempt to meet the progressive necessities of World War I, House bill 5326 was penned as ten sections by the United States 65th Congressional session.

Sec. 1 – Temporary Increase of Army Signal Corps and Aviation Sections

Sec. 2 – Additional Commissioned Personnel Authorized
Qualifications
Appointments by U.S. President
Appointments by U.S. President and Senate

Sec. 3 – Additional Enlisted Men by Enlistment or Draft
Age limit for men drafted
Chauffeur grades created
Chauffeur pay and rank 

Sec. 4 – Organization of Tactical Units
Headquarters and detachment units

Sec. 5 – General Officers Appointed for Staff and Other Duties
Temporary appointments for created vacancies

Sec. 6 – Rating of Aviators and Aeronauts
Certificates of qualifications
Examinations
Ratings for service requirements
Exceptions in war time
Aeronauts rank increase
Flight duty financial compensation

Sec. 7 – Ratings of Enlisted Mechanicians
Balloon mechanicians compensation

Sec. 8 – U.S. Army Comprehensive Compensation
U.S. Army troop strength levels

Sec. 9 – Emergency Authority for Airships and Aerial Machines
Buildings and motor vehicles
Aviation stations
Sites and buildings
Use of public lands
Improvements of sites
Buildings and structures
Water, lights, and plumbing
Roads and wharves
Subsistence equipments
Fuel supplies
Construction machinery and tools
Special clothing
Domestic and abroad travel expenses
Vocational training
Compensation for reserve officers and enlisted personnel called into service
Pay accounts
Development of airplanes and engines 
Manufacturing plants maintenance
Schools for aviation technical instructions
New equipment exchanges
Foreign instructors travel compensation within the United States
 
Sec. 10 – Appropriation

Associated United States Federal Statutes
United States legislation for the governance, service, and training of airships designed and developed for military operations.

See also

Historic Airship Hangars in United States

Historical Bibliography

Historical Video Archives

External links
 

1917 in American law
65th United States Congress